Manisa 19 Mayis Stadium is a multi-purpose stadium in Manisa, Turkey.  It is currently used mostly for football matches and is the home ground of TFF Second League team Manisaspor.

The stadium is named after the date 19 May 1919 when Mustafa Kemal Atatürk set foot on land in Samsun to start the Turkish national independence movement.

With the promotion of Manisaspor to the Turkish Süper Lig at the end of the 2008–09 season, the stadium underwent renovation, boosting the capacity from 14,280 to 16,597.

Turkey national football team
The following national team match were held in the stadium.

Notes and references

External links
Manisa 19 Mayıs Stadium

Football venues in Turkey
Manisaspor
Multi-purpose stadiums in Turkey
Süper Lig venues
Buildings and structures in Manisa Province
Sports venues completed in 1974